Adetope Ademiluyi  (born August 23, 1965) is a Nigerian politician and former acting governor of Ekiti State.

Early life
Ademiluyi hail from Aramoko-Ekiti, Ekiti-West, Ekiti State.

Political career
He assumed the position of acting governor in Ekiti State on 27 April 2007, and succeeded Tunji Olurin, the previous acting governor. Ademiluyi held that position until 29 May 2007, when Olusegun Oni took office.
Adetope Ademiluyi formerly of the People's Democratic Party is now a member of the All Progressives Congress Party.

References

1965 births
Living people
Yoruba politicians
Governors of Ekiti State
People from Ekiti State
Peoples Democratic Party state governors of Nigeria